All for This is the debut solo album by Ben Moody. The album was released digitally June 9, 2009 via Amazon.com, iTunes, and Amie Street, through Moody's label, FNR Records.

Track listing

Personnel 
 Ben Moody — lead vocals, guitars, bass, drums, piano
 Hana Pestle — backing vocals, violin
 Marty O'Brien — bass

2009 debut albums
Ben Moody albums